Liu Xuan (born June 25, 1985, Tianjin, China) is a professional poker player whose winnings put her in the top 20 women at nearly $2 million in winnings. She is also the only woman to be at the final table at the PCA main event.

Education 
Xuan attended University of Waterloo, a hotbed of live poker games, studying social development studies and political science. She played throughout her time at university, even hosting games with other known poker players such as Glen Chorny, Steve Paul and Michael McDonald.

Poker career 
Xuan started focusing on live tournaments in early 2011. Her 2011 events included third place at the European Poker Tournament San Remo. The placement at the final table got her a win of just over half a million dollars. It was her first cash main event with the EPT.

Between 2011 and 2018, Xuan made over $100,000 in four different years.

Xuan was sponsored by 888poker until 2015, which is when her quieter years began. Since 2010, she's played at over 40 cash games and won 4 titles.

References 

Female poker players
University of Waterloo alumni
Living people
1985 births